The Tutor is an 18th-century German play by Jakob Michael Reinhold Lenz. It has the subtitle "Or The Benefits of a Private Education". In the 20th century, it was adapted into a play of the same name by Bertolt Brecht.

German plays
Plays by Jakob Michael Reinhold Lenz